Joseph Finbarr Lennon (1934 – 23 November 2016) was a Northern Irish Gaelic football manager, player and sports broadcaster who featured on The Sunday Game.

Playing career
His league and championship career with the Down senior team spanned seventeen seasons from 1954 to 1970. Lennon captained Down to the All-Ireland title in 1968.

Honours

Player

Down
All-Ireland Senior Football Championship (3): 1960, 1961, 1968 (c)
Ulster Senior Football Championship (7): 1959, 1960, 1961, 1963, 1965, 1966, 1968 (c)
National Football League (3): 1959–60, 1961–62, 1967–68 (c)

Ulster
Railway Cup (4): 1960, 1964, 1966, 1968 (c)

References

1934 births
2016 deaths
Aghaderg Gaelic footballers
All-Ireland-winning captains (football)
Down inter-county Gaelic footballers
Gaelic games writers and broadcasters
Stamullen Gaelic footballers
Ulster inter-provincial Gaelic footballers